Mount No More is a mountain in the New York–New Jersey Highlands of the Appalachian Mountains in Warren County, New Jersey.

References

Mountains of Warren County, New Jersey
Mountains of New Jersey
White Township, New Jersey